A stumbling block or scandal in the Bible is a metaphor for a behaviour or attitude that leads another to sin or to destructive behaviour.

Bible use

Hebrew Bible 
The origin of the metaphor is the prohibition of putting a stumbling block before the blind. Geoffrey W. Bromiley calls the image "especially appropriate to a rocky land like Palestine".  In the Hebrew Bible, the term for "stumbling block" is Biblical Hebrew . In the Septuagint,  is translated into Koine Greek , a word which occurs only in Hellenistic literature, in the sense "snare for an enemy; cause of moral stumbling". In the Septuagint  a stumbling block means anything that leads to sin.

New Testament 
It appears 15 times in the New Testament in 12 unique verses according to Strong's Concordance.

The noun   has a derived verb,  (formed with the  suffix as English "scandalize"), meaning literally "to trip somebody up" or, idiomatically, "to cause someone to sin." This verb appears 29 times in 27 New Testament verses.

Apart from skandalon the idiom of "stumbling block" has a second synonym in the Greek term proskomma "stumbling." Both words are used together in 1 Peter 2:8; this is a "stone of stumbling" ( λίθος προσκόμματος) and a "rock of offense" ( πέτρα σκανδάλου).  The antonymous adjective  (ἀπρόσκοπος), "without causing anyone to stumble," also occurs three times in the New Testament.

Later use

Judaism 

The Leviticus warning is developed in rabbinical Judaism as lifnei iver "before the blind."

Christianity

Catholicism 
"Scandal" is discussed by Thomas Aquinas in the Summa Theologica. In the 1992 Catechism of the Catholic Church, it is discussed under the fifth commandment (Thou shalt not kill) section "Respect for the Dignity of Persons".

Active scandal is performed by a person; passive scandal is the reaction of a person to active scandal ("scandal given" or in Latin ), or to acts which, because of the viewer's ignorance, weakness, or malice, are regarded as scandalous ("scandal received" or in Latin ).

In order to qualify as scandalous, the behavior must, in itself, be evil or give the appearance of evil.   To do a good act or an indifferent act, even knowing that it will inspire others to sin — as when a student studies diligently to do well, knowing it will cause envy — is not scandalous.  For example, to ask someone to commit perjury is scandalous, but for a judge to require witnesses to give an oath even when he knows the witness is likely to commit perjury is not scandalous. It does not require that the other person actually commit sin; to be scandalous, it suffices that the act is of a nature to lead someone to sin. Scandal is performed with the intention of inducing someone to sin.  Urging someone to commit a sin is therefore active scandal.  In the case where the person urging the sin is aware of its nature and the person he is urging is ignorant, the sins committed are the fault of the person who urged them. Scandal is also performed when someone performs an evil act, or an act that appears to be evil, knowing that it will lead others into sin.  (In case of an apparently evil act, a sufficient reason for the act despite the faults it will cause negates the scandal.) Scandal may also be incurred when an innocent act may be an occasion of sin to the weak, but such acts should not be foregone if the goods at stake are of importance.

Protestantism 
The term "stumbling block" is common in Protestant writings. An early use was Martin Luther's consideration that the common belief that the Mass was a sacrifice was a "stumbling block."

Modern "scandal" 

The  Greek word  was borrowed from Greek to Latin to French, and finally to English as "scandal". The modern English meaning of scandal is a development from the religious meaning, via the intermediate sense of "damage to reputation".

References

Sources

Citations 

Catholic moral theology
New Testament words and phrases
Book of Leviticus